The Journey ( Sancharram) is a 2004 Malayalam language feature film written, directed and produced by Ligy J. Pullappally, inspired both by her short film Uli and a true story of two lesbian lovers in the South Indian state of Kerala.

Plot
The film follows two young friends, Kiran, a Hindu, and Delilah, a Catholic, from their first meeting as young children to young adulthood, when they realize their love for each other.

A student in their same class, Rajan, has a crush on Delilah and he asks Kiran to pen love letters to her on his behalf. Kiran does so as it allows her to express her love to Delilah without having to be ostracized by her family and society. Eventually Delilah discovers the truth behind the letters and poetry, and admits her mutual love to Kiran. This begins a delicate love affair, despite social taboos against homosexuality.

Their love affair is severely impeded when Rajan discovers Kiran and Delilah stealing a moment of intimacy in the woods. He informs Delilah's mother, of what he witnessed. Delilah's Mom confronts her, who reveals her love for Kiran. To save the family from disgrace, she arranges a marriage for Delilah with a suitor who had recently visited with intent on finding a bride. Delilah reluctantly consents to the marriage. Kiran tries to convince Delilah to run away with her after gaining support from her uncle who lived in a distant place, but Delilah tells Kiran that it's not possible and tells her that what had existed between them was over.

While Delilah's wedding proceeds as planned, a heartbroken Kiran walks to a cliff overlooking a waterfall, where she and Delilah had once gone together. At the same time, Delilah is about to take her marriage vow but stops. She runs out of the church and yells Kiran's name. Kiran looks behind her but doesn't see anyone. She reaches for a cocoon on a branch and slips on the edge, but is able to stop the fall and pull herself up. As she lies on her back, Kiran sees a blue butterfly flying above her. Delilah looks up to the sky and sees a blue butterfly in the air.

Cast
Shruthy Menon as Delilah
Suhasini V. Nair as Kiran
K. P. A. C. Lalitha as Amma, Delilah's mother
Valsala Menon as Ammachi, Delilah's grandmother
Syam Seethal as Rajan
Suresh Babu - as Narayanan Kurup, Kiran's father
Ambika Mohan as Priya Kurup, Kiran's mother
Venu Machat - as Ezhithachan
Sangeeta - as the Teacher

Critical reception 
Autostraddle listed the movie as being among the 102 best lesbian films of all time.

Comparisons to Fire
Sancharram has been compared to Deepa Mehta's 1996 film Fire, a movie which also touches upon lesbian relationships in India. However, where Fire is explicit in stating that the main characters enter their relationship due to the failure of their heterosexual marriages, Sancharram is clearly a film about two lesbians who fall in love with each other.

See also 
 Ek Ladki Ko Dekha Toh Aisa Laga (2019)
 List of LGBT-related films directed by women
 Homosexuality in India

References

Further reading

External links
  (archive)
 
  The Journey at Wolfe Video

2004 films
2004 LGBT-related films
2000s Malayalam-language films
Indian drama films
Indian interfaith romance films
Indian LGBT-related films
Lesbian-related films
LGBT-related films based on actual events
Films set in Kerala
Films shot in Kerala